Grenade-sur-l'Adour (literally Grenade on the Adour) is a commune in the Landes department in Nouvelle-Aquitaine in southwestern France.

Geography
The town is located between two larger towns of Aire-sur-l'Adour and Mont-de-Marsan.

Population

Sights
Areas of interest include a 15th-century bastide and a Catholic church of the same era.

References

See also
Communes of the Landes department

Communes of Landes (department)